The 2017 Southern Conference men's basketball tournament took place Friday, March 3 through Monday, March 6 in Asheville, North Carolina, at the U.S. Cellular Center. The entire tournament was streamed on ESPN3, with the Southern Conference Championship Game televised on ESPN at 7pm EST. The champion, East Tennessee State, received an automatic bid into the 2017 NCAA tournament with a 79–74 win over UNC Greensboro.

Seeds

Bracket

References

Tournament
Basketball competitions in Asheville, North Carolina
College sports tournaments in North Carolina
College basketball in North Carolina
Southern Conference men's basketball tournament
Southern Conference men's basketball tournament
Southern Conference men's basketball tournament